Walking Forward is a Namibian documentary web series produced by Tim Huebschle. The first season premiered in December 2020 on YouTube.

Production  
Walking Forward was shot in Windhoek in October 2020. The scripts were written by Ndinomholo Ndilula. The interviewees were drawn from the various arts and cultural sectors, including performing arts, fashion, music, visual arts and dance.

Cast 
 Ndinomholo Ndilula (Interviewer / Artist & Creative Entrepreneur)
 Kulan Ganes (Casting Agent / Pencilled Casting)
 Slick Upindi (Stand-up Comedian / Free Your Mind)
 Eva-Maria Manchen (Fashion Designer / Katharina Karl)
 Heino Manchen (Manufacturing / Katharina Karl)
 Leena Shipwata (Model / Leena Shipwata Modelling Academy)
 Galilei Njembo (Classical Music Student)
 Jackson Wahengo (Musician)
 Victoria Hailapa (Production Manager / Penduka Namibia)
 Andy Diergaardt (Acting Director / Penduka Namibia)
 Gina Figueira (Curator / StartArt Gallery)
 Nikhita Winkler (Choreographer / Nikhita Winkler Dance Theatre)
 Stanley Mareka (Dance Lecturer / Equipped Dance Academy)

References

External links

 
 
 Walking Forward Official Website
 Walking Forward on NamibInsider
 

Documentary web series